James Fulton (born 21 September 1977) is an English former cricketer. He played 21 first-class matches for Oxford University Cricket Club between 1997 and 1999. In 2015 he became Master in College at Eton College.

See also
 List of Oxford University Cricket Club players

References

External links
 
 

1977 births
Living people
English cricketers
Oxford University cricketers
Cricketers from Plymouth, Devon
Alumni of Brasenose College, Oxford